The Prelude and Fugue in G minor, BWV 861, is No. 16 in Johann Sebastian Bach's Well-Tempered Clavier Book I, keyboard music consisting of 24 preludes and fugues in every major and minor key.

Bach's G minor fugue is "insistent and pathetic". The subject also appears in his funeral cantata Gottes Zeit ist die allerbeste Zeit (God's time is the very best time). The subject of the fugue employs a minor 6th leap in the first measure, then resolves it with a more conventional stepwise motion. Overall, the piece has a foreboding and admonishing tone.

Harmonic analysis 

The prelude and the fugue of BWV 861 are set in G minor. Although no modulations are present, there are multiple times that the key deviates to the dominant.

Prelude 
The first two measures of the prelude are an elaboration of tonic. There is a chain of suspensions in m. 3 that leads to the secondary dominant (A major) that leads to the dominant (D major), which then leads back to tonic (G minor). The 5th measure begins with a ii-V-I progression and leads to a C dominant seventh chord.

This marks the beginning of a series of modulations moving up a fourth each time. He modulates twice, arriving in B major for the recapitulation of the opening theme in m. 1. A G dominant seventh chord is used in the fourth beat of m 8. Measure 9 marks the beginning of a sequence that lasts two measures and further establishes C minor as tonic. There is another recapitulation of the opening measure in mm. 11, this time in C minor. There is a diminished triad on beat 3 of mm. 12 and a D dominant seventh on the fourth beat as we prepare to modulate back to G minor. There is another C minor chord on the third beat of mm. 13, which turns into a Neapolitan sixth when the top line lands on an A on the fourth beat. The next measure begins on D, which leads to G minor for the second beat.

Tonic (G minor) is then elaborated until mm. 17. There is another Neapolitan chord that leads to a diminished chord on the raised fourth scale degree, providing a leading tone to the D dominant seventh chord with a 4-3 suspension in the soprano. The penultimate measure begins with a pedal tone that last till the end of the prelude. The G minor chord is turned into a G dominant seventh as it modulates to C minor, then a C diminished triad with the pedal tone G in the bass still. Finally, the dissonance is resolved and the piece ends with a Picardy third.

Fugue 
The subject of the fugue begins in G minor. The second voice enters on the pickup to the fourth beat of m. 2, and it begins in the dominant (D minor), even though the first note of the theme is a G in this instance. The third voice enters in m. 5 in the tonic and the fourth a measure later in the dominant once again. The first episode begins in D and modulates to the B major for the recapitulation of the subject. The second episode is in G minor, and it remains in G minor until the end of the piece with a Picardy third.

References

Sources 
Boalch, Donald Howard; Mould, Charles; Roth,  Andreas H. (1995). Makers of the harpsichord and clavichord 1440-1840 (3rd Edition). Clarendon Press
Dickinson, Alan Edgar Frederic (1956). Bach's Fugal Works, with an Account of Fugue Before and After Bach. I. Pitman and Sons
Dürr, Alfred (1989). New Bach Edition Series V: Keyboard and Lute Works Volume 6.1: Das Wohltemperierte Klavier I, Score and Critical Commentary Bärenreiter
Lowrance, Rachel A. (2003). "Instruction, Devotion, and Affection: Three Roles of Bach’s Well-Tempered Clavier". Musical Offerings, Vol. 4, No. 1

Further reading 
 Bach well tempered clavichord. For the piano, Book 1 (library vol. 13). Czerny Schirmer, 1893
 Pianos and their makers. Alfred Dolge. Covina publishing company, 1911, p. 31
 Oxford dictionary of music, Volume 6. Concert music 1630-1750. Edited by Gerald Abraham. Oxford University Press, 1986, pp. 627–646
 Oxford history of western music, Volume 2. Richard Taruskin. Oxford University Press, 2005, pp. 233–259
 Johann Sebastian Bach (Revised). C. Hubert Parry.  G P Putnam's sons London and New York, First printed in 1909

External links 

Interactive Hypermedia
BWV 861 Fugue (Flash) - Philip Goeth performing
BWV 846-869 Prelude and Fugue (Flash) at the BinAural Collaborative Hypertext David Korevaar, Philip Goeth, and Edward Parmentier performing
Video analysis of the Fugue in G minor,  BWV 861 (official YouTube channel of David Thomas)

Sheet Music
 

The Well-Tempered Clavier
Compositions in G minor